The Mercian Way is a  long cycle path that runs from Salisbury in Wiltshire to Chester in Cheshire. Operated by Sustrans, it is part of National Cycle Route 45, but is also well used by walkers. The path is so named because it passes through what was once the ancient Anglo-Saxon Kingdom of Mercia. To reflect its name a number of waymarkers depicting Saxon warriors were commissioned and have been placed along the route.

See also
 Mercian Trail

References

External links
NCR 45 at Sustrans

National Cycle Routes
Mercia